Koronavilkku (Swedish: Coronablinkern, English: Corona signal) is a COVID-19 app and a digital contact tracing mobile app developed by the Finnish Institute for Health and Welfare to inform citizens of when they may have been exposed to the COVID-19 virus. The free app became available for download on Google Play and App Store on August 31, 2020 and was downloaded one million times in the first day. By November 5, 2020, the app had been downloaded more than 2.5 million times.

The app is designed so that it does not tell the user the source of a potential infection, in order to ensure personal privacy. In a case of possible infection the users will receive a code that is entered into the application. Then the app notifies those who have been in proximity to the infected individual that they may also have been exposed to the virus. The app does not collect any personal information such as identity or location. The regularly changed and randomly generated codes guarantee that the users cannot be directly identified from the codes.

References

External links 
 

Android (operating system) software
iOS software
COVID-19 contact tracing apps
COVID-19 pandemic in Finland
2020 in Finland